"Little Bitty Pretty One" is a 1957 song written and originally recorded by Bobby Day.  The same year, the song was popularized by Thurston Harris. Produced by Aladdin Records (located in Los Angeles, Calif.), and featuring the Sharps on backing vocals, Harris's version reached No. 6 on the U.S. Billboard Best-Sellers chart and No. 2 on the R&B chart. The Bobby Day version reached No. 11 in the Canadian CHUM Chart.

Reception
Bryan Thomas writes that the song "has gone on to become one of the best loved oldies of the late '50s".

The song is famous for its hummed opening.

It was used in the 1989 comedy/fantasy film Little Monsters.

Cover versions
Frankie Lymon reached No. 58 on the Billboard Hot 100 chart in 1960. 
Clyde McPhatter returned it to the top 40 in the US, when his recording peaked at No. 25 on the Hot 100 in 1962.
The Dave Clark 5 covered it in 1965 on their US Top 25 "Weekend in London" album
Wayne Cochran covered it in 1967
In 1972, the Jackson 5 included it on their album, Lookin' Through the Windows, and took the song to No. 13 on the Hot 100. 
Cliff Richard, in 1983 on his Silver album.
Aaron Carter performed "Little Bitty Pretty One" for the 2001 Disney movie The Princess Diaries.
In 1994, Huey Lewis and the News did their take for their album Four Chords & Several Years Ago.
 Billy Gilman did a cover in it and included it on his One Voice album in 2000.

"Wiggle, Wiggle"
"Little Bitty Pretty One" was the inspiration for the Accents' sole hit "Wiggle Wiggle" in 1958, and though the similarities were evidently not sufficient to warrant a lawsuit, Aladdin Records took the expedient step of covering the song with a group called the Chestnuts.

References

1957 songs
1957 singles
1962 singles
1972 singles
Songs written by Bobby Day
Clyde McPhatter songs
The Jackson 5 songs
Checkmates, Ltd. songs
Aladdin Records singles